is a transportation company on Shikoku, Japan. Headquartered in Takamatsu, Kagawa, the company operates a funicular and aerial lifts.

History
June 26, 1964: Founded as Yakuri Cable.
December 28, 1964: Yakuri Cable Line opens.
November 14, 1970: The company is renamed as Yakuri Hashikura Cable.
April 1, 1972: Hashikurasan Ropeway opens.
March 28, 1987: Unpenji Ropeway opens.
August 1, 1987: The company is renamed as Shikoku Cable.
July 21, 1992: Tairyūji Ropeway opens.
April 1, 1999: Hashikurasan Ropeway is spun off into a separate company.

Lines
Yakuri Cable: A funicular line in Takamatsu, Kagawa.
Unpenji Ropeway: An aerial lift in Kan'onji, Kagawa.
Tairyūji Ropeway: An aerial lift between Naka and Anan, Tokushima.

See also 
 List of funicular railways

External links
 Official website

Railway companies of Japan
Railway companies established in 1964